Savitri is a 1937 mythology legend Hindi film directed by Franz Osten. Adapted from  a story in the Mahabharata the writers were Niranjan Pal with dialogues by J. S. Casshyap. The cinematographer was Joseph Wirsching. Saraswati Devi composed the music. According to Garga,  Savitri was the "only mythological" produced by Himanshu Rai for Bombay Talkies, who were known for making "rurlist reform dramas". 
Ashok Kumar and Devika Rani played the lead roles supported by Maya Devi, Saroj Borkar, Mumtaz Ali, and Sunita Devi.

The film is based on an incident from the epic Mahabharata and tells the story of Savitri and Satyavan, played by Devika Rani and Ashok Kumar. Savitri persists in getting the god of death, Yama, to revoke her husband Satyavan's death.

Plot
Savitri is born as a boon from the Sun God and thus shares a blood-relation with Karna as a sister, to Ashwapati, the King of Madra and his wife Malawi. Savitri meets and falls in love with Satyavan, the son of the blind King Dumatasena. Dumtasena's Minister has taken over his kingdom and exiled the king, who now lives in the forest. When Savitri decides to marry Satyavan, the sage Narada advises against it, as according to the planetary charts, Satyavan will die a year following their marriage. However, Savitri insists on going ahead, ready to take on Yama the God of death. A year later when Savitri sees Yama  carrying  Satyavan's soul she follows and discourses with him, while continuing her pursuit. Finally, Yama tells her she can ask three boons of him except for Satyavan's life. The boons Savitri asks for are: sight for her father-in-law and restoration of his kingdom, her father should be granted a hundred sons, and last, she be granted a hundred sons. Yama gives in to her request, thereby restoring Satyavan's life. Her father-in-law's sight is restored and he learns of the death of his usurper.

Cast
 Devika Rani as Savitri
 Ashok Kumar as Karan
 Kamta Prasad
 Chandraprabha
 Sunita Devi
 Vimala Devi
 Maya Devi
 Sushila
 Aloka
 Madhurika Devi
 Tarabai Solanki	
 Kamta Prasad		
 Mumtaz Ali		
 P. F. Pithawala			
 M. Nazir

Savitri In Indian Cinema
There were about thirty-four versions of the Savitri Satyavan films made. One of the earliest was the film Savitri produced in 1913 by Dadasaheb Phalke. The 1923 version, Savitri also called Satyavan Savitri, was an Italian co-production directed by Giorgio Mannini and J. J. Madan produced by Madan Theatres Ltd. and Cines. Savitri (1933) was the first film produced by East India Film Company. Directed by C. Pullaiah, it received an Honorary Certificate at the Venice Film Festival.

Soundtrack
Music was composed by Saraswati Devi with lyrics by J. S. Casshyap. The singers were Devika Rani, Ashok Kumar, Sushila Bhiwandkar, Chandraprabha, and P. F. Pithawala.

Songlist

References

External links
 

1937 films
1930s Hindi-language films
Indian black-and-white films
Films directed by Franz Osten
Films about Savitri and Satyavan
Indian fantasy films
1937 fantasy films